Donald Carmody (born April 16, 1951) is an American-born Canadian film and television producer.

Born in Rhode Island and raised in Montreal, he earned a BA in communication studies from Loyola College, one of Concordia University's founding institutions, in 1972. He began his career in the 1970s at Cinèpix Film Properties, where he worked on the early films of David Cronenberg with Ivan Reitman, and later moved to Harold Greenberg’s Astral Bellevue Pathé, where he was an executive in charge of production. Leaving Astral, he served as co-producer on Bob Clark’s box office smash, Porky's, for decades, Canada's highest-grossing film worldwide.

Carmody has produced some 100 films thus far, including Denis Villeneuve's Polytechnique (2009), The Mighty, Yesterday, The Boondock Saints,  and he was a member of the producing team on the hit musical Chicago, which was shot in Toronto and won an Academy Award in 2002 for Best Picture. He has also produced the video game adaptations the  Resident Evil and Silent Hill series. He is the recipient of five Canadian Screen Awards, and is a board member of the Canadian Film Centre.

Filmography

Film

Miscellaneous crew

Production manager

As an actor

Location management

Thanks
 Pay the Ghost (2015)
 Adventures in Public School (2017)
 Anon (2018)

Television
Executive producer
 Mary and Joseph: A Story of Faith (1979) (TV movie)
 A Man Called Intrepid (1979)
 The Tracker (2001) (TV movie)
 Tokyo Trial (2016)
 Between (2015–16)
 Northern Rescue (2019)

Line producer
 The Intruder Within (1981) (TV movie) (Uncredited)
 Payoff (1991) (TV movie)

Producer
 The Late Shift (1996) (TV movie)
 The Secret Life of Marilyn Monroe (2015)
 Shadowhunters (2016)

Miscellaneous crew

Production manager

References

External links

Living people
1951 births
People from Providence, Rhode Island
American emigrants to Canada
Film producers from Quebec